Farha or Farhah (Arabic: فَرْحَة, farḥah) is an Arabic female given name and a surname, meaning "delight, pleasure, luckier, good luck, good fortune". The name is the female form of the name Farhat and also stems from the name Farah. 

Notable persons with that name include:

People with the given name:
Farha Manzoor (born 1975), Pakistani politician who was a Member of the Provincial Assembly of the Punjab
Farha Mather (born 1996), Indian badminton player

People with the surname:
Juliana Farha (born 1966), Canadian writer and businesswoman
Leilani Farha, Canadian lawyer and UN administrator, advocate of housing as a human right
Omar Farha, American chemist and professor
Sam Farha (born 1959), Lebanese poker player

See also
Farah
Farhat
Farhan
Farha (film)